Johannes Bisse (1935–1984) was a Cuban botanist, born in Germany in 1935 and arrived in Cuba in 1966. He received his doctorate from the Friedrich Schiller University of Jena. He was the founder and first director of the Cuban National Botanic Garden in Havana.

He died in an automobile accident near the garden, shortly after its inauguration. The Encuentro de Botánica "Johannes Bisse in Memoriam", a botanical academic conference, is held every two years in Camagüey, Cuba in honor of his contributions on the field.

Bibliography

References

External links

 Photo 

Cuban botanists
20th-century German botanists
1935 births
1984 deaths
Botanists with author abbreviations
University of Jena alumni